The Lambda Chi Site, designated RI-704, is an historic archaeological site in South Kingstown, Rhode Island.  It encompasses the site of an 18th-to-19th century homestead near Kingston village.

The site was added to the National Register of Historic Places in 1984.

See also
National Register of Historic Places listings in Washington County, Rhode Island

References

Archaeological sites on the National Register of Historic Places in Rhode Island
South Kingstown, Rhode Island
National Register of Historic Places in Washington County, Rhode Island